Davide "Damna" Moras (born 18 August 1981) is an Italian singer who is the lead vocalist of the Italian folk/power metal band Elvenking and rock n' roll band Hell in the Club.

Biography 
His musical career goes back to 1996, when he started playing in a cover band, while continuing his studies in classical and electric guitar. He then entered Elvenking in 1998. After the recordings of the first demo To Oak Woods Bestowed in 2001, Elvenking signed with the German label AFM Records and released their first studio album, Heathenreel, which was recorded at New Sin Studios by Luigi Stefanini and mixed at Studio Fredman in Stockholm by producer Fredrik Nordström. It featured 11 songs, including "Pagan Purity", "Skywards", "Seasonspeech" and "White Willow". Before and after the release of the album, the band played several gigs and even collaborated with ex-Skyclad singer, Martin Walkyier, sharing the stage while playing some Skyclad tracks together. In 2002 though, Damnagoras decided to leave the band. In 2003, he started a new project Leprechaun together with Stormlord's bass player Francesco Bucci, Raintime's drummer Enrico Fabris and singer/keyboard player Whisperwind. Leprechaun released "The Ultimate Dance", a demo-CD for record companies. In 2004, Damnagoras rejoined Elvenking and in 2006 they released, The Winter Wake (AFM-Records) album which includes songs such as "The Wanderer", "The Winter Wake", and "Neverending Nights".

In 2009 Damna joined Hell in the Club, the rock n' roll band created by Secret Sphere's bassist Andrea Buratto. Their debut album, Let the Games Begin was released in 2010.
In February 2018 he released HITC – the graphic novel, based on his experiences as a musician, with the collaboration of the artist Simona Valentina Tornabene.

Discography

with Elvenking 
 To Oak Woods Bestowed (demo) (2000)
 Heathenreel (2001)
 The Winter Wake (2006)
 The Scythe (2007)
 Two Tragedy Poets (...and a Caravan of Weird Figures) (2008)
 Red Silent Tides (2010)
 Era (2012)
 The Pagan Manifesto (2014)
 Secrets of the Magick Grimoire (2017)
 Reader of the Runes – Divination (2019)

with Hell in the Club 
 Let the Games Begin (2011)
 Devil on My Shoulder (2014)
 Shadow of the Monster (2016)
 See You on the Darkside (2017)
 Hell of Fame (2020)

with Leprechaun 
 The Ultimate Dance (demo) (2004)

Bands

Member 
 Elvenking (1998–2002, 2004–present)
 Hell in the Club (2009–present)
 Leprechaun (2003–present)

Guest member 
 Spellblast (2006–2007) – vocals
 Mägo de Oz (2013) – vocals

References

External links 
 Elvenking official website

1981 births
Living people
People from Pordenone
Italian rock singers
21st-century Italian  male singers